The 1900 United States presidential election in Indiana took place on November 6, 1900. All contemporary 45 states were part of the 1900 United States presidential election. Indiana voters chose 15 electors to the Electoral College, which selected the president and vice president.

Indiana was won by the Republican nominees, incumbent President William McKinley of Ohio and his running mate Theodore Roosevelt of New York.

Results

See also
 United States presidential elections in Indiana

Notes

References

 

Indiana
1900
1900 Indiana elections